Conrad Dressler (22 May 1856 – 3 August 1940) was an English sculptor and potter.

Dressler was born in London and studied sculpture at the Royal College of Art. He was later influenced by the Arts & Crafts Movement. In the 1880s, he worked at Cedar Studios in Chelsea, London.  He worked in partnership with Harold Rathbone between 1894 and 1897 at the Della Robbia Pottery, and then moved to Marlow Common in Buckinghamshire, where he established the Medmenham Pottery specializing  in  architectural tiles and large wall panels, created from small sections.  The business was financed by Robert William Hudson until 1906 when it changed into the Dressler Tunnel Ovens Ltd, the  Medmenham tile designs continued to be made by J. H. Barratt of Stoke-on-Trent.  Dressler designed an industrial level tunnel kiln for the English pottery industry, for which he was awarded the John Scott Medal of the Franklin Institute.  Later he lived in Paris and the United States. He died at Saint-Brévin l'Océan, Loire, France.

References

External links

 The Sower, by Dressler
 Lupercalia by Dressler, front view - Flickr photo by Sheepdog Rex (Rex Harris)
 Sculpture Room at Walker Art Gallery (Lupercalia by Dresssler, right view, is at left of photo, backlit and partly obscured by lens flares) - Flickr photo by SomeDriftwood (Arthur John Picton)

1856 births
1940 deaths
English potters
English male sculptors
Alumni of the Royal College of Art
20th-century British sculptors
19th-century British sculptors
19th-century British male artists
Sculptors from London